Beatriz Lucero-Lhuillier, born Beatriz Lucero and more popularly known as Bea Lucero, is a Filipino former athlete and Olympian. She won a bronze medal at the 1992 Olympics in taekwondo, a demonstration sports at the Games.

Lucero graduated from International School Manila in 1991. Before switching to Taekwondo, Bea was an artistic gymnast.  She won 2 golds & 3 silver during the 1987 Southeast Asian Games held in Jakarta. Bea failed to make the team to the 1988 Seoul Olympics because of sports politics. Instead she joined the Philippine Delegation to Seoul to cover the gymnastics event. In 1992, she won a bronze medal in the featherweight division in taekwondo in the Olympic games in Barcelona with teammate Stephen Fernandez who also won a bronze medal. Her medal was not included in the official tally because it was a demonstration sport.

She advertised for Ivory Soap, Nestle Philippines and others. She is married to Jean Henri Lhuillier, Honorary Consul General of San Marino of the Philippines and President and CEO of Cebuana Lhuillier Pawnshop. She is a mother of three boys and a girl.

References

External links
 Wedding to John Henri Lhuillier
http://www.sigmadeltaphi.com/news_sdphonors.html
 "Staying Fit with Phiten". Philippine Star.
 "Jean Henri Lhuillier’s conferment as Consul General of the Most Serene Republic of San Marino to the Philippines".

Filipino female artistic gymnasts
Living people
Filipino female taekwondo practitioners
Olympic taekwondo practitioners of the Philippines
Taekwondo practitioners at the 1992 Summer Olympics
Beatriz
1972 births
Southeast Asian Games medalists in taekwondo
Southeast Asian Games gold medalists for the Philippines
Southeast Asian Games silver medalists for the Philippines
Competitors at the 1987 Southeast Asian Games
Asian Taekwondo Championships medalists
21st-century Filipino women